Scopula luxipuncta is a moth of the  family Geometridae. It is found in the Democratic Republic of Congo and Uganda.

References

Moths described in 1932
Taxa named by Louis Beethoven Prout
luxipuncta
Insects of the Democratic Republic of the Congo
Insects of Uganda
Moths of Africa